Michael Faber may refer to:

 Michael Faber (economist) (1929–2015), British economist
 Michael Faber (footballer, born 1939), East German footballer
 Michael Faber (footballer, born 1995), German footballer

See also
Mike Faber (disambiguation)
Michel Faber